Richard Knuckles is an American bobsledder who competed in the mid-1960s. He won a bronze medal in the four-man event at the 1965 FIBT World Championships in St. Moritz. Knuckles is from Virginia Beach, Virginia.

References

Bobsleigh four-man world championship medalists since 1930

American male bobsledders
Possibly living people
Year of birth missing